Lunenburg is a census-designated place (CDP) in and the county seat of Lunenburg County, Virginia, United States. The population was 165 at the 2010 census. The community is also known as Lunenburg Courthouse or Lunenburg Court House.

Geography
Lunenburg is in the center of Lunenburg County in southeastern Virginia. Virginia State Routes 40 and 49 pass through Lunenburg. SR 40 leads northwest  to Keysville, while SR 49 leads southwest  to Chase City. The highways join in Lunenburg and lead northeast together to Victoria.

The community sits on a ridge which drains northwest to Couches Creek and south to Reedy Creek, both tributaries of the Meherrin River, which flows southeast to the Chowan River and Albemarle Sound in North Carolina.

References

Census-designated places in Lunenburg County, Virginia
County seats in Virginia